Georgia gained one seat in reapportionment following the 1820 United States Census.

See also 
 1822 and 1823 United States House of Representatives elections
 List of United States representatives from Georgia

1822
Georgia
United States House of Representatives